The 18th Louisiana Infantry Regiment was a unit of volunteers recruited in Louisiana that fought in the Confederate States Army during the American Civil War. The regiment began forming in October 1861, but did not reach its full complement of 10 companies until January 1862. It served throughout the war in the Western Theater of the American Civil War. In 1862, the regiment served at Shiloh, First Corinth and Georgia Landing (Labadieville). In 1863, it fought at Fort Bisland and campaigned in south Louisiana. In November 1863, the unit merged with the 10th Louisiana Infantry Battalion, creating the 18th Consolidated Louisiana Infantry Regiment. The new regiment served during the Red River campaign in 1864, fighting at Mansfield, Pleasant Hill, and Yellow Bayou. The regiment remained in Louisiana and Arkansas for the rest of the war, before disbanding in May 1865.

See also
List of Louisiana Confederate Civil War units
Louisiana in the Civil War

Notes

References

 

Units and formations of the Confederate States Army from Louisiana
1861 establishments in Louisiana
Military units and formations established in 1861
1865 disestablishments in Louisiana
Military units and formations disestablished in 1865